The 1944–45 Gauliga Bayern was the twelfth and last season of the league, one of the regional divisions of the Gauligas in Germany at the time. It was the first tier of the football league system in Bavaria (German:Bayern) from 1933 to 1945. It was the final season of the league which operated in five regional divisions. None of the competitions were completed and some may not even have been started.

Of the five leagues the Gauliga München/Oberbayern progressed the furtherest with last recorded official Gauliga game being the Munich derby between FC Bayern and TSV 1860 on 23 April 1945, ending 3–2.

League football soon resumed in post-war Germany in mostly regional competitions. In the American occupation zone, in Southern Germany the tier one Oberliga Süd kicked off with the approval of the US occupation authorities on 4 November 1945, containing former Gauliga Bayern clubs 1. FC Nürnberg, Schwaben Augsburg, FC Bayern Munich, 1. FC Schweinfurt 05, BC Augsburg, TSV 1860 München and SpVgg Fürth.

Tables

München/Oberbayern
The 1944–45 season saw the München/Oberbayern (English: Munich/Upper Bavaria) division made up from five clubs from the 1943–44 Gauliga Südbayern and five promoted clubs.

Schwaben
The 1944–45 season saw the Schwaben (English: Swabia) division made up from four clubs from the 1943–44 Gauliga Südbayern and three promoted clubs.

Mittelfranken
The 1944–45 season saw the Mittelfranken (English: Middle Franconia) division made up from four clubs from the 1943–44 Gauliga Nordbayern and five promoted clubs.

Oberfranken
The 1944–45 season saw the Oberfranken (English: Upper Franconia) division made up from two clubs from the 1943–44 Gauliga Nordbayern and four promoted clubs. It is unknown whether any of the seasons games were played but the following clubs were grouped in the division:
 1. FC Bamberg
 Reichsbahn SG Weiden
 VfB Coburg
 FC Michelau
 KSG Bayreuth
 FC Bayern Hof

Oberpfalz/Niederbayern
The 1944–45 season saw the Oberpfalz/Niederbayern (English: Upper Palatinate/Lower Bavaria) division made up from two clubs from the 1943–44 Gauliga Südbayern and six promoted clubs. It is unknown whether any of the seasons games were played but the following clubs were grouped in the division:
 SSV Jahn Regensburg
 1. FC Straubing
 LSV Straubing 
 Reichsbahn SG Regensburg
 SpVgg Walhalla Regensburg
 Turnerschaft Regensburg
 Reichsbahn SG Schwandorf
 SpVgg Landshut

References

Sources

External links
 Das Deutsche Fussball Archiv  Historic German league tables

1944-45
1